Brenda Jones (later Carr, born 17 November 1936) is a retired Australian middle-distance runner. At the 1958 national championships she won the 440 yards and 880 yards races. In 1960 she was fifth in 440 yards and second in 880 yards. At the 1960 Olympics, she led the 800 m race, but in the last few metres lost to Lyudmila Shevtsova, who equalled her world record.

References

1936 births
Living people
Australian female middle-distance runners
Athletes (track and field) at the 1960 Summer Olympics
Olympic athletes of Australia
Olympic silver medalists for Australia
Medalists at the 1960 Summer Olympics
Olympic silver medalists in athletics (track and field)
People from Leongatha
Sportswomen from Victoria (Australia)